Felix Platter (also Plater ; ; Latinized: Platerus; 28 October 1536 – 28 July 1614) was a Swiss physician, well known for his classification of psychiatric diseases, and was also the first to describe an intracranial tumour (a meningioma).

Biography
Felix Platter was the son of Lutheran humanist, schoolmaster and printer, Thomas Platter, and the half-brother of Thomas Platter the Younger. In 1552, and only fifteen years old, Platter travelled by pony from Basel to the University of Montpellier to start a course of study under Guillaume Rondelet. He earned his medical doctorate from Montpellier in 1557. Once arrived, he lodged in the house of Laurent Catalan, the town pharmacist and a Maran or Christian Jew. Platter occasionally sent packages of fruits and seeds to his father. His studies took place in an atmosphere of terror and religious persecution. Rondelet taught his students the technique of pressing, drying and mounting botanical specimens on paper, a process practised by his former mentor, Luca Ghini.

Returning to Basel in 1557, Platter soon established himself as a successful physician and became professor of practical medicine at the University of Basel, amassing a famous collection of curiosities at his house as well as an enormous library of pressed plant specimens.

Platter's description of Dupuytren's disease in 1614 is explained with regard to his understanding of the anatomy. The current view that Platter believed the disease to be caused by dislocation and shortening of the flexor tendons is based upon misinterpretation of the original Latin text. With the help of his anatomical studies, Platter had proven that subcutaneous ligamentous extensions of the palmar aponeurosis and not the flexor tendons were responsible for Dupuytren's disease. Felix Platter realised more than one hundred and fifty years before Henry Cline, Astley Cooper, and Dupuytren, that the palmar aponeurosis was the anatomical substrate of the disease.

In the view of historian David Wootton, developed in the book Bad Medicine, Platter was the first proponent of the Germ theory of disease. His Praxeos Medicae (1602) was drawn on extensively by Robert Burton in the Anatomy of Melancholy.

References

1536 births
1614 deaths
16th-century Swiss physicians
17th-century Swiss physicians
Swiss medical writers